General César Leonidas Mendoza Durán (September 11, 1918 – September 13, 1996) was a member of the Government Junta which ruled Chile from 1973 to 1990, representing the country-wide police force, the Carabineros de Chile.

Mendoza was born in Santiago, the youngest of the eleven children of Atilio Mendoza Valdebenito, a science teacher and first mayor of La Cisterna, and Amalia Durán, a pianist.  In 1938, young César Mendoza began his compulsory military service.  In 1940, he matriculated at the Carabineros' School, from which he graduated as a second lieutenant the following year.  Mendoza worked in different cities during his police career, starting in 1942 as a lieutenant at Molina, Talca, and the Carabineros' School.  He was promoted to captain in 1953, to major in 1959, to lieutenant colonel in 1965, to colonel in 1968, to general in 1970, and to general inspector in 1972. On 10 September 1973 Mendoza was the eighth in rank in the Chilean Police Corps, a professional military body which could have stood up to the army in defense of the Allende government. He agreed to join the coup leaders who promoted him to General Director. In this position, he eventually formed part of the Government Junta that came into power in the September 11 1973 coup d'état (which coincidentally happened on Mendoza's birthday). Of the four members of the Junta (who represented the Chilean Army, Air Force, Navy and Carabineros or National Police), Mendoza was widely considered the one who held the least amount of power and influence, even being derisively referred to as Mendocita.

Mendoza served in the Government Junta until August 2, 1985, where the public outcry from Caso Degollados led to his forced resignation. He was replaced by Rodolfo Stange Oelckers.

A noted horseman, Mendoza won a silver medal in the XV Olympic Games of 1952 at Helsinki as a member of the show jumping team.

References

1918 births
1996 deaths
Heads of state of Chile
Chilean police officers
Chilean anti-communists
Leaders who took power by coup
Olympic silver medalists for Chile
Olympic equestrians of Chile
Chilean male equestrians
Equestrians at the 1952 Summer Olympics
Show jumping riders
Sportspeople from Santiago
Olympic medalists in equestrian
Medalists at the 1952 Summer Olympics
Pan American Games gold medalists for Chile
Pan American Games bronze medalists for Chile
Pan American Games medalists in equestrian
Equestrians at the 1951 Pan American Games
Equestrians at the 1959 Pan American Games
Medalists at the 1951 Pan American Games
Medalists at the 1959 Pan American Games